The Shenzhen Japanese School is a Japanese international school in the Xinchen Dasha, Shekou Industrial Zone, Nanshan District, Shenzhen. As of 2007, the largest group of foreigners in Shenzhen are in Shekou, and the Japanese school was one of many foreign schools in that area.  it is one of eight schools in Shenzhen designated for children of foreign workers.

History

The Shenzhen Japanese Chamber of Commerce proposed establishing a Japanese school in 2004. The Japanese school was sponsored by Shenzhen Fuji Xerox and several other Japanese companies. On April 23, 2008 the Ministry of Education of China approved the establishment of the school. 

The school opened on Friday June 13, 2008. The school had 39 students and 17 teachers uopn opening. Initially, the school was temporarily housed on the second floor of the Haitao Hotel  in Shekou. The school was scheduled relocate to a permanent location within three years.

See also
 Japanese people in China
Mainland China-aligned Chinese international schools in Japan:
 Kobe Chinese School
 Yokohama Yamate Chinese School

Notes

References

Further reading
 "办好深圳日本人学校" (Archive). 深圳特区报 at Sznews.com. December 25, 2010. Also posted on Sina.

External links

  Shenzhen Japanese School

International schools in Shenzhen
Shenzhen
2008 establishments in China
Educational institutions established in 2008
Private schools in Guangdong